Mankin may refer to:

People
 Hart T. Mankin, American lawyer
 Helen Douglas Mankin (1896-1956), American politician
 Romi Mankin (b. 1947), Estonian physicist
 Valentin Mankin (b. 1938), Soviet / Ukrainian sailor
 Michael J. Mankin (b. 1948), American architect, disability rights leader.

Places
 Mankien (or Mankin), a town in South Sudan
 Mankin, Texas, an unincorporated community in the United States
 Mankins, Texas, an unincorporated community in the United States